Gelvaran-e Pain (also Romanized as Gelvarān-e Pā’īn and Gol Varān-e Pā’īn) is a village in Koregah-e Gharbi Rural District, in the Central District of Khorramabad County, Lorestan Province, Iran. At the 2006 census, its population was 114, in 23 families.

References 

Towns and villages in Khorramabad County